Père-Louis-Marie Ecological Reserve is an ecological reserve in Quebec, Canada. It was established on May 12, 1993.

References

External links
 Official website from Government of Québec

Nature reserves in Outaouais
Protected areas established in 1993
1993 establishments in Quebec